Onehunga Mangere United is an amateur association football club in Māngere Bridge, New Zealand. They currently compete in the NRFL Championship.

History

The club was formed in 1921 as a sporting club for members of the Onehunga Methodist Church. In 1924 at a meeting of members the decision was taken to rename the club Onehunga Athletic Soccer Club and Waikaraka Park became the clubs first official home ground before becoming the Onehunga Association Football Club in 1926. In 1964 at the A.G.M. there was a suggestion that the club look seriously at incorporating the Māngere name as Onehunga Mangere United AFC. In 1965, the club took over the sporting grounds located at the base of Māngere Mountain in Māngere Bridge. The 1965 season saw the start of the new Northern League with Onehunga Mangere, the first of the new name, perched in the first division. The club relocated, after being given permission by Auckland Council, to relocate to Mangere Domain where they remain to this day.

The club won the New Zealand Chatham Cup as Onehunga in 1954 and has made the last 32 teams in the cup twice in 1986 and 2006.

Honours
Chatham Cup: 1954
Auckland Football Association Division 1 Champions: 1956, 1958
Northern League Division 2 Champions: 2021
Northern League Division 3 Champions: 1984, 1999
Northern League Division 4 North Champions: 1983

References

External links
OMUAFC Website
Auckland Football Federation OMU page

Association football clubs in Auckland
Association football clubs established in 1921
1921 establishments in New Zealand
Māngere-Ōtāhuhu Local Board Area